Agency Rent-a-Car was founded in Solon, Ohio (a suburb of Cleveland) as the nation's first "Insurance Replacement" car rental company by Sam J Frankino in 1969.

Specialty
Agency Rent-a-Car specialized in delivering cars to people whose personal vehicles had been in an accident and needed a temporary replacement, usually paid for by their insurance company. The company eventually grew to have offices nationwide and a fleet of 40,000 cars until being sold to Avis. The company also opened wholly owned subsidiaries known as Amerex Rent-a-Car and Altra Auto Rental.

References

Further reading
 Barker, Robert, "Smashing Success: Agency Rent-A-Car's Growth Is No Accident," Barron's, July 28, 1986, p. 13.
 Marcial, Gene G., "Is Someone Tailing Agency Rent-A-Car?," Business Week, February 26, 1990, p. 92.

External links

1969 establishments in Ohio